It is known by the names Shukravari Talao (lake), Gandhi Sagar Lake and  Jumma lake. It is located in Nagpur in front of  Raman Science Center. The lake which is said to be exists for more than 275 years, was established as a source of water supply by Chand Sultan, the then ruler of Nagpur. He created the water body in the form of streams being diverted to the Nag River, which was connected to the water reservoir and named it as 'Jumma Talab'. Subsequently, it came to be known as 'Shukrawari Talao' during the Bhonsla and British periods when the first Raghuji declared Nagpur as the capital of his domain in 1742.

The picturesque rectangular shaped Gandhi Sagar reservoir is now enclosed with stonewalls and iron railings. There is a small island in the middle of the lake. And that's a garden local name spoon gardenShiva temple and a garden illuminated with yellow mercury light at night.

References

Geography of Nagpur
Lakes of Maharashtra
Tourist attractions in Nagpur district